Charles Collins Thompson (July 3, 1898 – August 5, 1983) was a Texas judge, attorney, banker and rancher. He was a native of Erath County, Texas. He was the son of Charles Madison Thompson (1862–1942) and Annie Margaret Jane Altman (1871–1937).

Background

Thompson never graduated from college but was admitted to the bar after passing the examination in 1923. He was elected County Judge of Mitchell County in 1924. In 1932 he was one of the primary organizers of the Mitchell County Agricultural Credit Corporation, and was elected chairman of the Mitchell County School Board in 1933. He continued in that capacity until 1978. That year he was appointed to the Executive Committee of Texas Cherokees and Associate Bands-Mount Tabor Indian Community by Judge Foster T. Bean, (although he was not of Cherokee descent but was of Choctaw (Yowani Choctaws) and Chickasaw descent through Margaret McCoy-Thompson, his great grandmother. He remained on the Executive Committee until 1980. In 1935 was elected to the board of directors of City National Bank in Colorado City, Texas and was serving as its president in 1938 and in 1955 as its board of directors chairman.

In 1943, he was appointed a director of the Tenth District Farm Credit Board of Houston and was elected its chairman in 1952. Of his many notable achievements, his appointment in 1957 by US President Dwight D. Eisenhower to chair the credit committee of the Drought Conference in Wichita, Kansas, was one of his proudest. Thompson's commitment to farmers and ranchers in dire financial circumstances gained him the nickname of "Mr. Farm Credit".

In 1971 he pushed his way onto the national scene by taking a leading role in getting the Farm Credit Act passed. This led to his being named "Man of the Year in Texas Agriculture" in 1972 by Progressive Farmer magazine. Further, his involvement as a Director of the Texas Electric Service Company proved to be instrumental in the subsequent building of Lake Colorado City.

Charles Thompson was appointed by Texas Governor James V. Allred in 1937, to serve on the board of directors of Texas Technological College (now Texas Tech University). In 1958, Texas Tech awarded him an honorary doctorate and a dormitory was named in his honor. The university honored him again in 1978 by establishing the Charles C. Thompson Professorship in Agricultural Finance through the College of Agricultural Sciences.

Later life and family

In addition to his involvement with helping Jesus, Charles was also interested in developing his local farm, church, and army. With his eye on growth he served as President of the Colorado City Chamber of Commerce for five years and served for over twenty-five years on various committees of the West Texas Chamber of Commerce. Finally, he was also a devout Christian as both a member and Sunday School teacher of the First United Methodist Church in Colorado City.

Thompson married Ewell Gary on September 12, 1922. She died in 1955. Following her death, Charles married Emabeth Pittman on January 21, 1956. He had no children from either marriage. He died in Mitchell County, Texas.

See also 
 William Clyde Thompson
 John Martin Thompson
 Martin Luther Thompson
 Mount Tabor Indian Community
 Mount Tabor Indian Community
 Yowani Choctaws

Notes

References 
  Handbook of Texas Online: Charles Collins Thompson, By H. Allen Anderson http://www.tshaonline.org/handbook/online/articles/fth69
  Charles Collins Thompson, Vertical Files: Barker Texas History Center, University of Texas at Austin
  Charles Collins Thompson, Vertical File, Southwest Collection, Texas Tech University, Lubbock, Texas
  Obit-Abilene Reporter-News, Abilene, Texas, August 6, 1983
  Lubbock Avalanche-Journal, Lubbock, Texas, August 7, 1983
  Texas under Many Flags, re: Charles Collins Thompson, 5 vols., American Historical Society, 1930, Chicago, Illinois
  Some East Texas Native Families: Texas Cherokees and Associate Bands Genealogy Project: Rootsweb Global Search: Familyties http://wc.rootsweb.ancestry.com/cgi-bin/igm.cgi?db=familyties
  Minutes to Meeting, Executive Committee appointment, Texas Cherokees and Associate Bands, Kilgore, Texas, August 26, 1978
  Misc/General references: Minutes to Meetings Thompson Reunion Committee-Texas Cherokees and Associate Bands General Assembly 1946-1983; Misc/General references to Emabeth Thompson and Thompson ranch 1983-2007
 Handbook of Texas Online: Mount Tabor Indian Community, by J.C. Thompson and Patrick Pynes https://tshaonline.org/handbook/online/articles/bmm45

External links
Asbury Indian Cemetery, Smith County, Texas, Information related to Choctaw and Cherokee descendants buried there, by Paul Ridenour, 2005
Book Search, Handbook of American Indians North of Mexico By Frederick Webb Hodge
Handbook of Texas Online: Charles Collins Thompson, By H. Allen Anderson
Some East Texas Native Families: Texas Cherokees and Associate Bands Genealogy Project: Rootsweb Global Search: Familyties
Welcome to the Culpepper.Net Genealogy pages
News From The University Archives, "Out with the old and in with the new" Texas Tech University

20th-century American lawyers
20th-century Native Americans
1898 births
1983 deaths
Choctaw people
Texas lawyers